The Third Marx cabinet (German: Drittes Kabinett Marx) was the 14th democratically elected government during the Weimar Republic. The cabinet was named after Chancellor Wilhelm Marx and was in office for only seven months. On 17 May 1926 it replaced the Second Luther cabinet after the resignation of Hans Luther on 13 May 1926. Marx resigned with his cabinet on 17 December 1926 but remained in office as caretaker. He formed another government on 29 January 1927.

Establishment
Chancellor Hans Luther had resigned on 13 May 1926 following a controversy over allowing the use of the imperial flag and refused to remain in office as caretaker. Deputy-Chancellor Otto Gessler thus stepped in for him and was asked by president Paul von Hindenburg to form a new government. However, the Social Democratic Party (SPD) was unwilling to tolerate a minority cabinet led by him. The parliamentary group of the Centre Party then asked Konrad Adenauer, mayor of Cologne, to come to Berlin. However, Adenauer was unwilling to build a temporary minority cabinet as a stepping stone to an eventual grand coalition and aimed at the creation of a majority government, including the SPD. For the German People's Party (DVP), parliamentary leader  refused to entertain the idea of a coalition with the SPD for the foreseeable future due to domestic policy disagreements. He would rather see a move to include the German National People's Party (DNVP) in a future government and as a possible stepping stone in this direction the formation of a "neutral" technocratic cabinet with no links to the SPD. Adenauer thus gave up within a day of having started the talks (15 May). 

That same day, during a meeting of the caretaker cabinet, Gustav Stresemann mentioned Minister of Justice Marx as a potential new chancellor. In the evening, Hindenburg asked Marx to form a new cabinet. Before the Centre Party was willing to agree, they asked the DVP for clarification regarding the outlook for a majority government being eventually formed. The parliamentary groups of the two parties came to an agreement on 16 May. This stated the intent of both sides to expand the coalition as soon as possible to a Reichstag majority. However, only parties would be considered that accepted the binding nature of current international agreements and who supported the current foreign policy stance. This satisfied both parties: the DVP could hope for an eventual compromise on the part of the DNVP regarding their opposition to Stresemann's foreign policy which would allow their inclusion in the government. DDP and Centre viewed the new minority government as a stand-in until a majority one could be formed including the SPD.

Only a day later a new cabinet was formed. All the ministers of the Second Luther cabinet kept their positions. Marx left the Justice and Occupied Territories portfolios vacant (with himself as caretaker) in case the grand coalition should prove possible that summer once the plebiscite over the expropriation of the princes was out of the way. Only when this hope proved elusive due to the opposition of the Social Democrats to the government's stance on the expropriation issue did Marx appoint Johannes Bell as Minister of Justice and asked him to serve as caretaker for the Occupied Territories job.

Composition
The Reich cabinet consisted of the following Ministers:

Resignation
The Third Marx cabinet fell over a controversy surrounding illegal and clandestine activities by the Reichswehr. These included links to far-right organisations such as the and Der Stahlhelm, as well as secret cooperation with the Soviet Red Army that contravened Germany's obligations under international treaties.

Information about these activities caused the SPD to cancel its cooperation agreement with the government on 9 December. The cabinet sought to avoid a conflict by initiating negotiations that would result in a "grand coalition", including the SPD. On 15 December these talks seemed to make progress. However, that same evening the Social Democratic Reichstag parliamentary group voted to make a voluntary resignation of the cabinet a pre-condition for any formal discussions about a grand coalition. This was rejected by the cabinet and the parties supporting it.  

On 16 December, Philipp Scheidemann gave a speech in the Reichstag in which he blasted the secret Reichswehr activities and announced a vote of no confidence. The parties of the right called him a traitor, but on 17 December the vote of no confidence tabled by the SPD in the Reichstag was supported by DNVP and the Communist Party of Germany. The cabinet resigned and was asked by the President to remain in office as a caretaker. It took until 29 January to form a new cabinet. Wilhelm Marx then became the head of a new government, the Fourth Marx cabinet.

References

Marx III
Marx III
1926 establishments in Germany
Cabinets established in 1926
Cabinets disestablished in 1926